Abdi Hashim Abdelahi is a politician from Somalia who has been elected twice to serve as Speaker of the Senate of Somalia. He took the office in January 2017.

Personal life 
He was born on 1 December 1946, in Oromia in Ethiopia. He is a former Minister of Heritage and Culture and Minister of Health in the Transitional Federal Government of Somalia.

References 

1946 births
Living people
People from Oromia Region
Government ministers of Somalia
Health ministers of Somalia
Members of the Federal Parliament of Somalia